Atbasar Airport  is an airport in Kazakhstan located  north of Atbasar in the Akmola Region. The airport contains a small unpaved airstrip with a small loop taxiway feeding into a small parking area. There are two buildings onsite.

References

External links
 Mindat.org: Atbasar Airport, Aqmola Oblysy

Airports built in the Soviet Union
Airports in Kazakhstan